Patrick Breuzé (7 January 1953 – 12 June 2022) was a French journalist and writer.

Works
La Vallée des loups (2002)
Le Silence des glaces (2004)
La Grande Avalanche (2005)
La Malpeur (2007)
La Lumière des cimes (2009)
Les Remèdes de nos campagnes (2011)
La Montagne effacée (2011)
La Valse des nuages (2012)
L’Étoile immobile (2014)
Mon fils va venir me chercher (2016)
La Montagne pour refuge (2017)
La Jeune Fille qui déplaçait les montagnes (2019)
Bout d'chien (2020)
Les Buveurs de ciel (2021)

References

1953 births
2022 deaths
21st-century French writers
21st-century French novelists
People from Versailles